is a popular Japanese children's song with lyrics written by Ujō Noguchi (野口雨情 Noguchi Ujō) and composed by Nagayo Motoori (本居 長世 Motoori Nagayo). Published in Kin no fune (The golden ship) magazine in July 1921. Nanatsu no ko is used as the departure melody at Isohara Station in Kitaibaraki and also as 6 p.m bell in Japan Advanced Institute of Science and Technology at Nomi, Ishikawa.

Lyrics

In popular culture 
In the manga and anime Detective Conan by Gosho Aoyama, the mail address of the boss of the Black Organization is #969#6261, which reproduces the beginning of Nanatsu no Ko.

Is sung in the anime Magical Girl Ore episode 10 by Mohiro to console a lost child.

References

External links
 https://www.scribd.com/doc/12770359/Nanatsu-No-Ko - Sheet music

Japanese children's songs
Japanese-language songs
Songs about birds
Fictional septets
1921 songs